The men's 800 metres at the 2018 European Athletics Championships took place at the Olympic Stadium on 9, 10, and 11 August.

Records

Schedule

Results

Round 1

First 3 in each heat (Q) and the next fastest 4 (q) advanced to the Semifinals.

Semifinals
First 3 (Q) and next 2 fastest (q) qualify for the final.

Final

References

800 M
800 metres at the European Athletics Championships